Shannon Masters is a Canadian screenwriter. She is best known for the film Empire of Dirt, for which she won the Canadian Screen Award for Best Original Screenplay at the 2nd Canadian Screen Awards in 2014.

Of Cree descent, she is a graduate of the Canadian Film Centre's screenwriting program.

In 2021 she was announced as the writer and showrunner for a television adaptation of Michelle Good's award-winning novel Five Little Indians.

References

External links

Canadian women screenwriters
Best Screenplay Genie and Canadian Screen Award winners
Cree people
First Nations women writers
Living people
First Nations screenwriters
Canadian Film Centre alumni
21st-century First Nations writers
21st-century Canadian women writers
Year of birth missing (living people)
21st-century Canadian screenwriters